The Coach House is a music venue located at 33157 Camino Capistrano in San Juan Capistrano, California. The venue opened in 1980. It hosts aspiring artists as well as those established in the industry. 

Some notable past performers include B.B. King, Bonnie Raitt, Richard Marx, The Motels, Billy Squier, Pat Benatar, Eddie Money, Chris Isaak, Tori Amos, Tom Jones, Miles Davis, Warren Zevon, Frank Black, UFO, J.J. Cale, Lone Justice/Maria McKee, Rick Derringer, and Devo.

Events
In May of 2019, a benefit concert was held for surf music legend Dick Dale. Artists such as Will Glover of The Pyramids, Bob Berryhill of The Surfaris, Bob Spickard of The Chantays and other surf musicians were selected to play at the event.

References

Music venues in California
1980 establishments in California